Gymnopilus omphalina is a species of mushroom in the family Hymenogastraceae.

See also

List of Gymnopilus species

External links
Gymnopilus omphalina at Index Fungorum

omphalina
Fungi of North America
Taxa named by William Alphonso Murrill